is J-pop artist Mayumi Iizuka's 11th album.

Exposition 
 The first released CDs have a rhinestone made by Swarovski.
 Song #1, #3, #5, #6 and #7 are lyrics by Mayumi Iizuka, and Song #6 is composed by HoshiMai (星舞), the pen name of Mayumi Iizuka.

Track listing 
 Crystal Days (クリスタルデイズ)
 Lyrics: Mayumi Iizuka
 Composition: cota
 Arrangement: Michiaki Kato
 Dear
 Lyrics: Tombow and Yuya Tsunagawa
 Composition: Yuya Tsunagawa
 Arrangement: Masanori Takumi
 Mawaridasu Kimochi (まわりだす気持ち / The Rolling Feeling)
 Lyrics: Kohei Dojima and Mayumi Iizuka
 Composition: Kohei Dojima
 Arrangement: Masanori Takumi
 Baby, Dance with Me
 Lyrics and composition: Sora Izumikawa
 Arrangement: Tomofumi Suzuki
 Only You
 Lyrics: Kohei Dojima and Mayumi Iizuka
 Composition: Kohei Dojima
 Arrangement: Tomofumi Suzuki
 Sotto (そっと/ Tenderly)
 Lyrics: Mayumi Iizuka
 Composition: HoshiMai (Mayumi Iizuka)
 Arrangement: Michiaki Kato
 Ima Kokode (いまここで / Here and Now)
 Lyrics: Kohei Dojima and Mayumi Iizuka
 Composition: Kohei Dojima
 Arrangement: Tomoki Hasegawa
 Rose Rose
 Lyrics: Kaori Kano
 Composition and arrangement: cota
 Capri Blue Friend
 Lyrics: Kaori Kano
 Composition and arrangement: Tomoki Hasegawa
 Mille-feuille (ミルフィーユ)
 Lyrics and composition: Sora Izumikawa
 Arrangement: Michiaki Kato

External links 
Ani-son Tsushin Vol.18 Mayumi Iizuka  - Log-in is required
"Mayumi Iizuka Live Strawberry Crystal 2007" was the Live that Sparkles Like a Crystal  - Log-in is required

2007 albums
Mayumi Iizuka albums